David Pepper may refer to:

Sir David Pepper (intelligence official) (born 1948), British intelligence official, director of GCHQ
David Pepper (politician) (born 1971), American politician from Ohio